Radal Siete Tazas National Park is a national park located in Curicó Province, Maule Region, Chile. It lies in a pre-Andean area close to Descabezado Grande volcano.

History
This protected area was reclassified as a national park in 2008.

After the February 27, 2010 earthquake one of the park's main attraction, the Seven Cups, completely dried up. It is believed a rock fissure allowed the water to empty into an aquifer.

Geography
The park's most popular feature is the area known as Siete Tazas (Seven Cups), which consists of seven consecutive natural pools with their respective waterfalls along Claro River. These waterfalls range from 1 to 10.5 metres. There are also two high waterfalls called El Velo de Novia (The Bridal Veil) and La Leona (The Lioness), with single vertical drops of 40 and 20 metres respectively. Many kayakers paddle the smaller falls ranging from 1 to 10.5 metres (3–32 feet). Once kayakers enter the steep canyon the only way out is down. Many tourists congregate on platforms surrounding the canyon to watch the kayakers as they navigate the waterfalls. At the end of the run kayakers must make a quick move to shore in order to avoid the 40 meter waterfall. This is the end of the canyon where kayakers then hike out.

Biology
The park protects tree species mainly of the genus Nothofagus, including the threatened Nothofagus glauca and Nothofagus leonii, as well as Nothofagus macrocarpa, Nothofagus dombeyi, Nothofagus antarctica and Nothofagus alpina. Also it is possible to find vulnerable and rare species, as are Austrocedrus chilensis and Maytenus chubutensis.

The park is home to an endangered subspecies of Cyanoliseus patagonus known locally as Tricahue.

References

 Reserva Nacional Radal Siete Tazas

External links

National parks of Chile
Protected areas of Maule Region